The Boucherville City Council (Français: Conseil municipal de Boucherville) is the governing body of Boucherville, a city located in the region of Montérégie in Quebec, Canada.

List of councillors (2017-present)

List of councillors (2015-2017)

List of councillors (2013-2015)

List of mayors (1954-present)

References

Boucherville
Municipal councils in Quebec